Peter Buxtun (sometimes referred to as Peter Buxton; born 1937 in Prague) is a former employee of the United States Public Health Service who became known as the whistleblower responsible for ending the Tuskegee syphilis experiment.

Personal life 
Buxtun is of Jewish and Czech descent. He was born in 1937 in Prague.

Career 
Buxtun, then a 27-year-old social worker and epidemiologist in San Francisco, was hired by the Public Health Service in December 1965 to interview patients with sexually transmitted diseases; in the course of his duties, he learned of the Tuskegee experiment from co-workers. He later said, "I didn't want to believe it. This was the Public Health Service. We didn't do things like that." In November 1966, he filed an official protest on ethical grounds with the Service's Division of Venereal Diseases; this was rejected on the grounds that the experiment was not yet complete. He filed another protest in November 1968, seven months after the assassination of Martin Luther King Jr., pointing out the political volatility of the study; again, his concerns were ruled irrelevant.

In 1972, Buxtun leaked information on the Tuskegee experiment to Jean Heller of the Associated Press. It first appeared in the Washington Star. Heller's story exposing the experiment was published on July 25, 1972; It became front-page news in The New York Times the following day. Senator Edward Kennedy called Congressional hearings, at which Buxtun and officials from the U.S. Department of Health, Education, and Welfare testified. The experiment was terminated shortly afterwards. 

In May 1999, Buxtun attended the launch of a memorial center and public exhibit to the experiment in Tuskegee. On November 4, 2019, Buxtun was inducted as an honorary member of Delta Omega, the honorary society in public health.

References

External links 
 
 

1937 births
American whistleblowers
Human subject research in the United States
United States Public Health Service personnel
Living people
People from Prague
American epidemiologists
Czech emigrants to the United States
Czech epidemiologists